Errachidia (Berber: ⵉⵎⴻⵜⵖⴰⵔⵏ Imetɣaren) is a city in Morocco, located in the Errachidia Province, and is the capital of the Drâa-Tafilalet region.

The city's residents speak Berber and Moroccan Arabic.

Toponymy 
Formerly known as "Ksar Es Souk", the city was renamed Errachidia around 1975 in honor of the second son of Hassan II, Moulay Rachid.

Culture
The city was part of the route of the 2006 and 2007 Dakar Rally.

Climate
Errachidia has a hot desert climate (Köppen climate classification BWh).

Notable people 
 Abdalaati Iguider - 1500m runner
 Rachid Neqrouz - Former footballer 
 Mohamed Ounajem - professional footballer
 Meir Sheetrit - Former Member of the Knesset and Minister in Israel

References

External links

Ksars
Populated places in Errachidia Province
Errachidia
Regional capitals in Morocco